The year 1928 was marked, in science fiction, by the following events.

Births and deaths

Births 
 March 6 : William F. Nolan, American writer
 June 8 : Kate Wilhelm, American writer (died 2018)
 July 3 : Georges-Jean Arnaud, French writer (died 2020).
 July 16 : Robert Sheckley, American writer, (died 2005)
 July 28 : Angélica Gorodischer, Argentine writer.
 August 11 : Alan E. Nourse, American writer (died 1992)
 December 16 : Philip K. Dick, American writer (died 1982)

Deaths

Events

Literary releases

Novels 
 The Skylark of Space, by Edward Elmer Smith.
  Amphibian Man, by Alexander Beliaev.
 The Rocket to the Moon, by Thea von Harbou.
  Hans Hardts Mondfahrt, by Otto Willi Gail.

Stories collections

Short stories 
 When the World Screamed, by Arthur Conan Doyle.

Comics

Audiovisual outputs

Movies

Awards 
The main science-fiction Awards known at the present time did not exist at this time.

See also 
 1928 in science
 1927 in science fiction
 1929 in science fiction

References

Science fiction by year

science-fiction